Fino is a dry sherry variety.

Fino or FINO may also refer to:

Fino (surname)
FINO,  "First In Never Out", a humorous scheduling algorithm
FINO, Bolivian brand of oils and spreads from Industrias de Aceite
LG L Fino, smartphone/phablet  by LG Electronics
Yamaha Fino, a Yamaha scooter
Fino (river), river in eastern central Italy

See also